Kanna Hayashi is an assistant professor at Simon Fraser University and St. Paul's Hospital Chair in Substance Use Research.

Education
In June 2008, Hayashi helped found the Mitsampan Community Research Project.

She earned her PhD in interdisciplinary studies from the University of British Columbia in 2013. Two years later, Hayashi received a UBC Killam Postdoctoral Research Prize.

Career
Hayashi joined the Simon Fraser University in 2016. The next year, she was appointed the inaugural St. Paul’s Chair in Substance Use Research at the BC Centre on Substance Use.

Selected publications
The following is a list of selected publications:
High rates of midazolam injection and associated harms in Bangkok, Thailand (2013)

References

External links

Living people
Academic staff of Simon Fraser University
University of British Columbia alumni
Columbia University alumni
Year of birth missing (living people)